Sayyid Ibrāhīm ibn Muḥammad ibn Mūsā al-Kāẓim also known as Ibrāhīm al-Mujāb and al-Ḍarir al-Kūfī, was the son of Muḥammad al-ʿĀbid, and grandson of Mūsā al-Kāẓim, the seventh Twelver Shia Imam. He was the first Alid to settle in Karbala, where he died, and was buried in the Imam Husayn shrine.

al-Mujab has many descendants that are known today by various names. Al Faiz is the only line of his that remained in Karbala until this day, since he settled in 861. As for his other descendants, most of them emigrated to other cities and countries, some of them are known today as Al Qazwini, Al Hamami, Al Awadi, Al Sabziwari, and Al Khirsan. It is also reported, that the scholars al-Sharif al-Radi and al-Murtada are descendants of al-Mujab.

Biography 
The date and place of al-Mujab's birth are unknown.

al-Mujab migrated from Kufa to Karbala in 861, after the Abbasid caliph al-Mutawakkil was killed at the hands of his son, al-Muntasir. al-Muntasir was more merciful towards the Shias, and sympathetic with the Alids, allowing them to freely visit the grave of Husayn. 

al-Mujab became the first custodian of the Husayn and Abbas shrines.

It is reported that when al-Mujab entered the shrine of Husayn, he called, "Peace be upon you, O' father" to which he received an answer from the grave in a loud voice; "and with you be peace, O' my son"; and thus, became known as al-mujab, meaning "the answered one".

One of his descendants recorded the incident in poetry, stating:

Death and resting place 
Al-Mujab died in Karbala, in 912. He was buried in the grand courtyard of the Husayn shrine.

In 1804, al-Mujab's grave and rawaq (hallway) were added to the north west side of the Husayn shrine's precinct, under the supervision of the shrines' custodian at the time, Jawad Nasrallah, as part of an expansion of the Husayn shrine.

The zarih above his grave was renewed in 2013, by the Iranian association responsible for religious sites in Iraq.

References 

Family of Muhammad
Shia imams
8th-century imams
Karbala
Custodian of the Imam Husayn Shrine
8th-century Arabs